Myrmecophila tibicinis is an orchid in the genus Myrmecophila. A common name for the species is the trumpet player's Schomburgkia. It was first described by Bateman in 1838, as Epidendrum tibicinis, and assigned to the genus Myrmecophila by Rolfe in 1917.

It is found growing in seasonally dry deciduous forest at elevations from 300 to 600 metres in full sun on trunks and larger branches in Belize, Costa Rica, Guatemala, Honduras, Venezuela and Colombia.

The pseudobulbs are large (18 in or 45 cm) and in the wild, there are always ants living in the pseudobulb, with their debris supplying additional nutrients.

It may be confused with M. brysiana but differs in having a larger magenta flower and a larger column while M. brysiana has smaller flowers which are yellow.

References

Taxa named by John Lindley
Orchids of Central America
Orchids of Belize
Flora of Honduras
Flora of Venezuela
Flora of Costa Rica
Flora of Colombia
Flora of Belize
Flora of Guatemala
Laeliinae